Oeonistis altica is a moth of the family Erebidae first described by Carl Linnaeus in 1768. It is found in south-east Asia, including China, Hong Kong, Laos, Vietnam, Indonesia, northern India, the Philippines, Taiwan as well as the Australian state of Queensland.

References

Moths described in 1768
Lithosiina
Taxa named by Carl Linnaeus